Beylerbeyi can refer to:

 Beylerbeyi
 Beylerbeyi, Sarayköy
 Beylerbeyi Palace
 Beylerbeyi Palace Tunnel
 Beylerbeyi event

See also
 Beylerbey